Praefaunula is a genus of satyrid butterflies found in the Neotropical realm.

Species
Listed alphabetically:
Praefaunula armilla (Butler, 1867)
Praefaunula liturata (Butler, 1867)
Praefaunula vesper (Butler, 1867)

References

Euptychiina
Butterfly genera
Taxa named by Walter Forster (entomologist)